Paul Seguin (born 29 March 1995) is a German professional footballer who plays as a defensive midfielder for Bundesliga club Union Berlin.

Club career
Born in Magdeburg, Seguin came through the academy system at 1. FC Lok Stendal in 1999. In 2007, he joined the VfL Wolfsburg Academy. He was called up the second team in 2014. He made his professional debut in the Regionalliga Nord on 24 August 2014 against Hamburger SV II and on 6 December 2014, he scored his first goal of his career against VfR Neumünster. He has played 36 games and scored 7 goals for VfL Wolfsburg II since 2014. On 4 March 2015, he made his debut for first team in DFB-Pokal against RB Leipzig. He played one minute after he replaced Kevin De Bruyne.

On 17 January 2019, Seguin was loaned out to Greuther Fürth for the rest of the season with an option to buy. On 7 May it was confirmed, that Greuther Fürth had decided to activate the option and he signed a three-year contract with the club.

International career
Seguin made his Germany U21 debut in a 1–0 win over Turkey U21 on 10 November 2016.

Career statistics

Club

Honours
VfL Wolfsburg
DFB-Pokal:2014–15

References

Living people
1995 births
Sportspeople from Magdeburg
Association football midfielders
German footballers
Germany youth international footballers
Germany under-21 international footballers
VfL Wolfsburg II players
VfL Wolfsburg players
Dynamo Dresden players
SpVgg Greuther Fürth players
1. FC Union Berlin players
Bundesliga players
2. Bundesliga players
Regionalliga players
Footballers from Saxony-Anhalt
German people of French descent